Simon James "Spike" Dawbarn (born 5 August 1974) is an English singer and dancer. He is a member of the boy band 911, who were originally active between 1995 and 2000 and had ten consecutive top 10 hits before splitting up in 2000. In 2012, 911 reformed for the ITV2 documentary series The Big Reunion, along with other bands from their time including Five, B*Witched and Atomic Kitten.

Biography

Early life
Spike Dawbarn was born in Warrington, Cheshire to parents Mo and Mike Dawbarn. He also has two brothers. Although he attended some dance college afterwards, his secondary education ended at the age of sixteen when he could not get a grant to go to a London stage school. He had a brief spell as a bricklayer on a building site, a position from which he was sacked. He acquired the nickname 'Spike' because of his hairstyle.

The Hit Man and Her and 911
Dawbarn went on to become a dancer on the ITV late night dance show The Hit Man and Her. In this role he worked alongside 'talents' such as Jimmy Constable and Jason Orange. In 1995, Dawbarn and Constable formed a partnership and teamed up with frontman Lee Brennan to form 911. Their first hit got to number 38 on the UK Singles Chart, with subsequent releases rising higher. Dawbarn choreographed a number of the band's dance routines.

PopSkool and after
Since 911's split in February 2000, Dawbarn has made a career joining the other band members in reunion tours. He was also director of a pop academy youth programme, PopSkool. PopSkool started in his home town of Warrington and has spread across the UK. It taught afternoon programmes in modern dance and vocal training to children between the ages of eight and sixteen. Dawbarn provided choreographic expertise and voice coaching is provided by Brennan.

Dawbarn had several 911 reunions for touring and TV appearances, including in 2008, 2012 and 2019.

On 15 October 2009, Dawbarn appeared on Never Mind the Buzzcockss identity parade round, but Phill Jupitus's team failed to pick him out.

Filmography

References

External links
PopSkool

1974 births
911 (English group) members
English male dancers
English pop singers
Living people
People from Warrington